Basilio Sánchez Beguiristáin (born 1903) was a Chilean physician. Between May 1960 and May 1963, Sánchez was the 26th Mayor of the commune of Pichilemu. He is also one of the founding members of the Pichilemu Fire Bureau (Cuerpo de Bomberos de Pichilemu) and was, for decades, the director of the hospital of Pichilemu.

Biography
Little is known of Sánchez Beguiristáin before his arrival in Pichilemu in 1933, at age 30. According to Historia Hospital de Pichilemu from the Chilean Ministry of Health Library, Sánchez arrived "on holidays [...] and like others was delighted for [Pichilemu's] beauty and quietness", and decided to stay in Pichilemu to work as a doctor; he was contracted by mayor Felipe Iturriaga Esquivel. Between 1933 and 1940, he directed the Dispensario San Rafael, first health organization of Pichilemu, created years before by fellow physician Eugenio Díaz Lira. On 1 November 1940, the Ministry of Health created the Pichilemu Relief House (Casa de Socorros de Pichilemu), and designated Basilio Sánchez as its First Chief. The relief house was elevated to the category of hospital in the 1960s, and became the Hospital of Pichilemu, with Sánchez continuing as its director.

In 1960, Sánchez was elected mayor of Pichilemu, and took office on 19 May. The direction of the hospital of Pichilemu, through his mayorship, was relegated to a doctor of Italian origin surnamed Matasi. His council was composed of the regidores Héctor Greene Valverde, Carlos Echazarreta Iñiguez, Alberto Araneda Concha, and Sergio Morales Retamal. He held the mayor position until 19 May 1963. Once he completed his mayoral term, he returned to the direction of the local hospital, and did so until 1976. Just before he resigned, he brought to the hospital two physicians from the University of Concepción, who were welcomed in a ceremony by then mayor Eduardo Parraguez Galarce. In that ceremony, Sánchez was named Illustrious Son of Pichilemu (Hijo Ilustre de Pichilemu), for "working in the health area in Pichilemu for almost fifty years." Following his resignation to the direction of the Hospital of Pichilemu, Sánchez retired.

Sánchez was a founding member of the Pichilemu Fire Bureau (Cuerpo de Bomberos de Pichilemu), founding which took place on 4 December 1945. He was named a member of the honorary direction of the fire bureau. Sánchez was also Super Intendant of the Pichilemu Fire Bureau between 1950 and 1951, and between 1961 and 1969. He also appears as a founding member of the Aerial Club of Pichilemu (Club Aéreo de Pichilemu); the club foundation occurred on 2 November 1964.

References

1903 births
Year of death missing
Mayors of Pichilemu
Chilean physicians
People from Irun
United Conservative Party (Chile) politicians
Spanish expatriates in Chile